The London Thunder are an English basketball club, based in the borough of Lewisham, London, England.

History
The club was established in September 2007. The club has developed from a community session with 12 youngsters to a registered charity engaging with over 200 registered players and 1000+ young people every year. The club is run by Steve Bucknall, the first Englishman to play in the NBA.

In 2018, the club were visited by Golden State Warriors guard Steph Curry, running a skills session with a number of junior players.

The Thunder entered the Men's English Basketball League in 2015. The club won the Division 4 Playoff final in 2019.

Players
Former Thunder player Kavell Bigby-Williams signed a one-year contract with the Charlotte Hornets of the NBA in July 2019. He currently plays for the Erie BayHawks in the NBA G League.

Former Thunder player Rowell Graham-Bell currently plays for CB Almansa in Spain's LEB Oro.

Home venue
In December 2012 the club were approached by the Surrey Canal Sports Foundation, the charitable body overseeing the sports and leisure aspect of the New Bermondsey Regeneration project. The club were offered the opportunity to take on a tenancy of a converted warehouse situated within the development location.  This opportunity was on the premise that the new development (to include a 3,000-seat arena with show court) will become the eventual permanent home of the club. The Thunderdome, officially launched in July 2014, means that the Thunder are therefore one of the few clubs in the country to manage their own dedicated basketball facility.

Academy
The Thunder, in partnership with King Henry School, run an under-19 team in the Academies Basketball League, the second tier under 19s basketball competition in the United Kingdom.

Season-by-season records

References

Basketball teams in England